Cascadilla School is a co-ed preparatory school in Ithaca, New York, United States. The school was established in 1876 as a tutoring and college preparatory school for Cornell University.

History
It was founded in 1876 as a boys' preparatory school for Cornell University. At this time, Universities typically required students to be proficient in Latin and Greek. However, students from rural areas often did not have access to instruction in these subjects. Some early members of the Cornell faculty became concerned about the quality of education available to such students and founded Cascadilla School to address this inequity. However, students also pursued athletic activities such as football and crew and created yearbooks to record their activities.

Shortly after the First World War, the school fell on hard financial times. They were forced to sell several buildings and parcels of land, including the Cascadilla School Boathouse, which still stands and is the centerpiece of Stewart Park. The building immediately south of the main classroom building once housed the dormitory, a dining hall, and a gymnasium but now has been remodeled to serve as an apartment building and is privately owned and operated.

In the later part of the 20th century, headmaster Maxwell Kendall began to accept female students, created a board of trustees for the school, made Cascadilla independent of (although still affiliated with) Cornell University, obtained accreditation from the New York State Board of Regents, obtained not-for-profit status, and marketed the school to international students with great success.

His son, John Kendall, a former history and math teacher at the school, later took over as headmaster and successfully opened the school up to students looking for an accelerated approach to their education. The accelerated program allows students to earn one unit of credit in one semester. In 1999 John Kendall's wife, Patricia Kendall, officially became the dean of students, and in 2001, she took over as headmistress, a position in which she serves to this day.

Between 40 and 60 students from ten different countries are guided by a faculty of twelve teachers, many of whom hold advanced degrees. Typically, Cascadilla School students go on to four-year colleges such as Binghamton University, Georgetown University, and New York University. Approximately 3,750 students have attended the Cascadilla School since 1876.

Athletics
Cascadilla offers its students four different athletic programs: 
Soccer (The Gryphons)
Basketball
Tennis
Equestrian Club (The Hippogriffs)

Notable alumni
 Hermann Biggs, physician and pioneer in the field of public health (Student, 1879)
 John L. Collyer, businessman and chairman of the Board of Trustees at Cornell University; served as chairman, president, and CEO at B. F. Goodrich (Class of 1913)
 Adolph Coors II, businessman who served as president at Coors Brewing Company; son of Adolph Coors (Class of 1903)
 Charles King, engineer and entrepreneur; first person in Detroit to design, build, and drive a self-propelled automobile
 John M. Olin, businessman and philanthropist; son of Franklin W. Olin (Class of 1909)
 Spencer T. Olin, businessman and philanthropist; son of Franklin W. Olin (Class of 1917)
 Henry Schoellkopf, football player at Cornell University and Harvard University; head football coach at Cornell from 1907 to 1908
 Walter Wanger, film producer and movie executive during the Golden Age of Hollywood (Class of 1912)

References

External links
Cascadilla School

Preparatory schools in New York (state)
Buildings and structures in Ithaca, New York
Schools in Tompkins County, New York
Private high schools in New York (state)